Joshua Bell (born 1967) is an American violinist.

Joshua Bell may also refer to:

 Joshua Fry Bell (1811–1870), U.S. Representative from Kentucky
 Joshua Bell (shoe manufacturer) (c. 1812–1863), early Canadian businessman
 Sir Joshua Peter Bell (1827–1881), member of the Queensland Legislative Assembly
 Joshua Thomas Bell (1863–1911), member of the Queensland Legislative Assembly, son of Joshua Peter Bell

See also
 Josh Bell (disambiguation)